Trojane is a settlement in the Municipality of Lukovica in central Slovenia. It lies in the northern part of the Sava Hills, on a hill near the border of two Slovene regions, Carniola and Styria. Until the freeway was finished in 2005, Trojane was on the main route from Ljubljana to Maribor.

History
The Romans built a road on the route connecting Aquileia, Emona, Atrans, and Celeia. Trojane was an important way station, military post, and marketplace, and the town was surrounded by a defensive wall.

The archaeological remains of Atrans can be still seen in Trojane. In the Roman Empire, Trojane (Atrans) was on the border between Italy and the province of Noricum.

Popular culture

Trojane is particularly known for the local restaurant's jelly doughnuts, originally made with apricot jam filling.
They also come in blueberry and chocolate flavour.

References

External links

Trojane on Geopedia

Populated places in the Municipality of Lukovica